Recap may refer to:
Summary (disambiguation)
Retread a resurfaced tire
Recap sequence
Dividend recapitalization
RECAP, archiving software for United States court documents
The Recap album